Gympie North railway station is located on the North Coast line in Queensland, Australia. It serves the town of Gympie.

History
Gympie North was opened on 4 February 1989 as a replacement for Gympie station, when the latter was bypassed by a new eight kilometre alignment that was built as part of the electrification of the North Coast line.

The station consists of one platform. Opposite the platform lie two crossing loops, and a siding in which an InterCity Express electric multiple unit stables at night.

Services
Gympie North is the northern boundary of the TransLink network. It is serviced by two daily City network services towards Brisbane Roma Street.

Gympie North is also served by long-distance Traveltrain services; the Spirit of Queensland, Spirit of the Outback and the Bundaberg and Rockhamption Tilt Trains.

A free shuttle bus operates between the station and Gympie town centre.

Services by platform

References

External links

Gympie North station Queensland Rail
Gympie North station Queensland's Railways on the Internet

Gympie
North Coast railway line, Queensland
Railway stations in Australia opened in 1989
Regional railway stations in Queensland